Demetrio Sodi may refer to:

 Demetrio Sodi Guergué (1866–1934), Mexican journalist, writer, jurist and politician
 Demetrio Sodi (born 1944), Mexican politician, grandson of the former